Takedda was a town and former kingdom located in present-day Niger. The archaeological site at Azelik wan Birni is believed to be the ruins of ancient Takedda.

History

Takedda was founded by the Sanhaja, a Berber tribal confederation inhabiting the Maghreb. In 1285, a court slave freed by Mari Djata, the founder of the Mali Empire, who had also served as a general, usurped the throne of the Mali Empire. In the 14th century (possibly also earlier and later) the Tuareg-controlled kingdom of Takedda, west of the Aïr Massif, played a prominent role in long-distance trade, notably owing to the importance of its copper mines. Takedda was visited by Ibn Battuta on his return trip from the Mali Empire in 1353.

Evidence of copperworking have been found at the site dating to the first millennium BC. The French archeologist, Danilo Grébénart, has excavated the site and has studied the significance of this prehistoric non-ferrous metal industry.

The reign of Mansa Sakoura (also spelt Sakura) appears to have been beneficial despite the political shake-up. He added the first conquests to Mali since the reign of Ouali including the former Wagadou provinces of Tekrour and Diara. His conquests did not stop at the boundaries of Wagadou however. He campaigned into Senegal and conquered the Wolof province of Dyolof then took the army east to subjugate the copper producing area of Takedda.

Notes

Sources

. First published in 1986, .
.
. Pages 279-304 contain Ibn Battuta's account of his visit to West Africa.

Further reading
.
.
.
.

Lost cities and towns
Mali Empire